Danko Bošković (Serbian Cyrillic: Данко Бошковић; born 27 January 1982) is a German footballer playing for TuS Mechtersheim as a playing assistant.

Career 
Bošković made his debut on the professional league level in the Bundesliga for 1. FC Kaiserslautern on 3 April 2004 when he came on as a substitute in the 75th minute in a game against FC Bayern Munich.

Personal 
Bošković was born in Neustadt an der Weinstraße. He also holds Serbian citizenship and is the cousin of Dragan Bogavac.

Honours 
 DFB-Pokal finalist: 2002–03

References

External links 
 

1982 births
Living people
People from Neustadt an der Weinstraße
German footballers
German people of Serbian descent
Bundesliga players
2. Bundesliga players
3. Liga players
Regionalliga players
1. FC Kaiserslautern players
1. FC Kaiserslautern II players
SV Wehen Wiesbaden players
Rot-Weiss Essen players
SC Paderborn 07 players
SV Sandhausen players
FC Carl Zeiss Jena players
VfL Wolfsburg II players
Serb diaspora sportspeople
Association football forwards
Footballers from Rhineland-Palatinate